Twelve is a chemical technology company based in Berkeley, California. 
They develop technology to convert  into profitable chemicals, such as plastics and transportation fuels. 
Currently, the company uses metal catalysts to produce synthetic gas (syngas), methane, and ethylene.

History 
Originally launched under the name Obtainium in 2014,
and later known as Opus 12,
Twelve was officially founded in 2015 by Dr. Kendra Kuhl, Dr. Etosha Cave, and Nicholas Flanders. 
The company was part of Lawrence Berkeley National Laboratory's first Cyclotron Road cohort, an incubator program that aids in the creation of environmentally beneficial companies.  
Since then, it has won multiple awards including the Keeling Curve prize, Ocean Exchange's WW Orcelle award, the Roddenberry prize, and Forbes' Change the World competition.
In 2021, Twelve received $57 million in series A funding; the company has also received funding through SBIR grants for projects involving  conversion. This includes generating products such as carbon monoxide, polyethylene, ethanol, ethylene, methane, and jet fuel.

Twelve has also been featured on the television show Inside Bill's Brain as a company providing a potential solution to greenhouse gas emissions.

Technology 

Nicholas Flanders describes the company's technology as "industrial photosynthesis" to create jet fuel and diesel from carbon dioxide. Their technology has been shown to convert   from raw biogas into carbon neutral methane.

Twelve utilizes polymer electrolyte membrane electrolysis, which splits apart water molecules into its component pieces (O2, electrons, and hydrogen ions) via the application of electricity.

In February 2020, Twelve partnered with Mercedes and Trinseo to create the world's first C-pillar made with polycarbonate from  electrolysis. 

In June 2020, the company partnered with SoCalGas and PG&E to advance their technology for use with  present in biogas, which comes from sources such as landfills, sewage, and dairy farms.
This gas, produced by the anaerobic breakdown of wastes, contains roughly 60% methane and 40% ; testing is being performed with the goal of achieving high conversion efficiency for long periods of time.

Twelve plans to scale up their technology to an industrial-sized shipping container, which would enable them to produce larger quantities of product.

References 

  
  
  
  
  
  
  
  
  
  
   
  
  
  
  
  
  
   
  
  
  
  
  
  
  
  
  
  

2015 establishments in California
Companies based in California